Hufel or Howfel or Hoofol or Hufal may refer to:
 Hufel, Izeh
 Hufel, Mahshahr
 Hufel-e Gharbi
 Hufel-e Seyyed Hamad
 Hufel-e Seyyed Khalaf
 Hufel-e Sharqi